William Allenwood Murray (September 6, 1893 – September 14, 1943) was an American professional baseball infielder. In 1917, he played in 8 games with the Washington Senators of Major League Baseball. In 21 at-bats, Murray had no home runs, 4 RBIs and a stolen base. Murray attended Brown University in Providence, Rhode Island and the College of the Holy Cross in Worcester, Massachusetts.

Minor leagues and later life
In 1917, Murray played with the Toronto Maple Leafs of the International League. In 1919, he played with the Springfield Ponies and the New Haven Weissmen of the Eastern League. Murray played the 1920 season with the Bridgeport Americans and the 1921 season with the Hartford Senators.

Murray died in 1943 at the age of 50 and was buried in Mount St. Benedict Cemetery in Bloomfield, Connecticut.

References

External links

1893 births
1943 deaths
Major League Baseball infielders
Washington Senators (1901–1960) players
Baseball players from Maine
People from Vinalhaven, Maine
Burials in Connecticut
Brown Bears baseball players
Holy Cross Crusaders baseball players
New Haven Weissmen players
Toronto Maple Leafs (International League) players
Springfield Ponies players
Bridgeport Americans players
Hartford Senators players